29 Aquarii is a binary star system located around 590 light years away from the Sun in the equatorial constellation of Aquarius. 29 Aquarii is the Flamsteed designation; the system also bears the variable star designation DX Aquarii. It is a challenge to view with the naked eye, appearing as a dim star with a combined apparent visual magnitude of 6.39. The system is moving further from the Earth with a heliocentric radial velocity of about +15 km/s.

This is a spectroscopic binary system with a close circular orbit taking just 0.945 days to complete. Despite their proximity, this does not appear to be a contact binary system. The orbital plane of the two stars lies near the line of sight, so they form an Algol-type eclipsing binary. The first component of the system is an A-type main sequence star with a stellar classification of A2 V. Its companion is giant star with a classification of K0 III.

The variability of this system was first noticed in 1965 by W. Strohmeier of Remeis-Observatory in Bamberg, Germany. He later discovered that the variability was caused by a binary companion eclipsing the primary star.

References

External links
 Image 29 Aquarii

A-type main-sequence stars
K-type giants
Spectroscopic binaries
Algol variables
Aquarius (constellation)
Durchmusterung objects
Aquarii, 029
209278
108797
8396
Aquarii, DX